Savvas Papazoglou (born 20 June 1934) is a retired Greek former international football player who played as a forward.

References

1934 births
Living people
Greece international footballers
Egaleo F.C. players
Apollon Smyrnis F.C. players
Panegialios F.C. players
Olympiacos F.C. players
Association football forwards
Footballers from Athens
Greek footballers